Kim Nam-jin (born August 1, 1976) is a South Korean actor. Kim began his entertainment career as a model, having walked the runway for Jang Kwang-hyo's Seoul Fashion Artists Association show in 1996 and appeared in advertisements for casual wear brand Storm in 1997. He began acting in 2002, and has since played leading roles in the romantic comedy film Spring Bears Love (2003), and several television dramas, including Ice Girl (2005), New Wise Mother, Good Wife (2007), Fly High (2007), and Don't Be Swayed (2008).

Filmography

Film

Television series

Music video

Theater

Awards and nominations

References

External links 
 
 
 Kim Nam-jin Fan Cafe at Daum
 
 
 

1976 births
Living people
South Korean male television actors
South Korean male film actors
South Korean male stage actors
People from Jeju Province